Agro-Industrial Complex is a term that exists to identify combination of several sectors of economy that provide mass production of food and consumer goods. The term is more common in countries of command economy, particularly the former Soviet Union where the term appeared in 1970s. Beside regular farming and agriculture it also encompasses such industries like forestry, fishing and others.

The agro based industries includes four main fields of interest
 Agriculture, the basis (nucleus) of the Agro-Industrial industries includes horticulture, animal husbandry, industrial farming, individual farming and so on
 Supporting industries and services that provide support to agriculture by means of production and material resources such as manufacturing of farming equipment including agricultural machinery as well as tools, production of fertilizers and other chemicals including pesticides, etc
 Industries that process agricultural basic goods such as food industry or industries that process agricultural basic goods for light industry
 Infrastructural section of the Agro-Industrial Complex includes productions that are involved in provision, transportation, safekeeping, trading of agricultural materials, training of human resources, construction

References

External links
 
 Nuclear Energy Centres and Agro-Industrial Complexes. International Atomic Energy Agency, Vienna, 1972
 

Agricultural production